The long-crested pygmy tyrant (Lophotriccus eulophotes) is a species of bird in the family Tyrannidae. It is found in the western Amazon Basin of Bolivia, Brazil and Peru. Its natural habitat is subtropical or tropical moist lowland forests and shrubland.

References

long-crested pygmy tyrant
Birds of the Amazon Basin
Birds of the Peruvian Amazon
Birds of the Bolivian Amazon
long-crested pygmy tyrant
long-crested pygmy tyrant
Taxonomy articles created by Polbot